Andrew David Poynter (born 25 April 1987) is a former Irish cricketer.

Poynter is a right-handed batsman and off-spin bowler who was trained at the Middlesex Cricket Academy and he made his first-class debut, aged eighteen for Middlesex County Cricket Club against Cambridge UCCE at Fenner's in 2005.  His uncle Deryck Vincent also represented Ireland.

International career
Poynter has represented the Ireland under-19 cricket team. He played six youth ODIs, scoring 148 runs at an average of 29.60 with a top score of 76. Progressing from age group cricket, Poynter was named in the Ireland A squad to play Denmark and Marylebone Cricket Club in summer 2007. Poynter scored 78 runs against Afghanistan in a match of 2010 ICC World Cricket League Division One, where Ireland won by 39 runs and Poynter adjudged man of the match as well.

Andrew Poynter, who played in all three games at the World Twenty20 in March, announced his retirement from international and representative cricket on 2 June 2016. The 29 year-old Clontarf batsman cited family and work commitments.

References

External links
 

1987 births
People from Hammersmith
Living people
Irish cricketers
Ireland One Day International cricketers
Ireland Twenty20 International cricketers
Middlesex cricketers
Leinster Lightning cricketers